Emiliano Massa (born 5 December 1988) is a former professional tennis player from Argentina who won two junior grand slam boys' doubles titles at the French Open.

Biography
Massa, who comes from Formosa, is the younger brother of top 100 player Edgardo Massa.

A right-handed player, Massa had a noted career on the ITF Junior Circuit. He won the Orange Bowl 16 and under singles title in 2004, which he followed up in 2005 with an 18 and under doubles title, partnering Leonardo Mayer. Massa, who was an Argentine Junior Davis Cup representative, won two French Open doubles titles, with Mayer in 2005 and Kei Nishikori in 2006.

He made his only appearance in the main draw of an ATP Tour tournament at the 2006 ATP Buenos Aires, where he and junior partner Mayer were a wildcard pairing in the doubles event. They were beaten in the first round by French players Olivier Patience and Florent Serra, in an encounter decided by a match tiebreak.

His professional career was hampered by shoulder injuries and he left the circuit after 2006, before making a brief comeback in 2010.

Junior Grand Slam finals

Doubles: 2 (2 titles)

ATP Challenger and ITF Futures finals

Doubles: 2 (2–0)

References

External links
 
 

1988 births
Living people
Argentine male tennis players
French Open junior champions
People from Formosa, Argentina
Grand Slam (tennis) champions in boys' doubles